Storrie Lake State Park is a state park in New Mexico, United States, located  north of Las Vegas, New Mexico in the Sangre de Cristo Mountains.

Activities at the park include camping, hiking, fishing, boating, and windsurfing.

References

External links
 Storrie Lake State Park

State parks of New Mexico
Parks in San Miguel County, New Mexico
Protected areas established in 1960